The Minister of Family Affairs and Social Services is one of the Finnish Government's ministerial portfolios. The ministerial position is located, along with the Minister of Social Affairs and Health, within the Ministry of Social Affairs and Health.

The Marin Cabinet's incumbent Minister of Family Affairs and Social Services is Krista Kiuru of the Social Democratic Party.

References 

Lists of government ministers of Finland